The Collingwood Magpies are an Australian netball team in Melbourne that competes in the premier domestic league, Suncorp Super Netball. The team was founded in 2016, during the disbanding of the ANZ Championship. The Magpies are owned by the professional Australian Football League entity, the Collingwood Football Club. Home games are usually played at John Cain Arena.

History
Following the dissolution of the trans-Tasman ANZ Championship competition in 2016, Netball Australia announced the creation of a new national Netball league, which would feature the five original Australian teams and three additional teams. In May 2016, Netball Australia confirmed that the Collingwood Football Club was one of three preferred license holders for the new teams.

Collingwood Magpies Netball was launched in September 2016 at the headquarters of the Collingwood Football Club, the Melbourne Sports and Entertainment Centre. The new team had a distinct logo, different from the football team, though a few years later the club elected to unify the logo with the football team. Speaking at the launch, club President Eddie McGuire stated "this team is not an add on to our [football] program by any stretch. It has its own identity, its own high performance unit in its own right and our strategy is to get the best people and best players possible."

2017–20: Early years
The Magpies debuted in the 2017 Super Netball season. For the inaugural season, Madi Browne was appointed team captain under head coach Kristy Keppich-Birrell. The Magpies entered the league with a star-studded squad of former and existing Australia national team players, thanks mainly due to significant financial weight backing the team. Consequently, the Magpies were widely tipped by pundits to win the league. However, the team finished the regular season fourth (out of eight teams) on the ladder and lost their elimination final to Giants Netball by one goal. In the following season the Magpies struggled for wins and consistency. Prominent defender Sharni Layton announced her retirement and the club elected not to extend the contract of coach Kristy Keppich-Birrell, replacing her with former Swifts coach Rob Wright at the end of the season. Wright oversaw the signing of new players Kelsey Browne and Geva Mentor among others, and the Magpies returned to finals, though were defeated by local rivals the Vixens in the elimination final. The following year the Magpies won only one of their fourteen games in the COVID-19-impacted season. Co-captain Madi Browne departed from the club and Rob Wright's tenure as coach ended. Wright was replaced by former Diamond and Magpies assistant Nicole Richardson as the new head coach.

Franchise

Venues
The Magpies primary home court is the 10,500-capacity Melbourne Arena. The club also plays one or two home games a year at the Silverdome in Launceston as part of an agreement with the government of Tasmania. Other venues the club has played home matches at in the past are Margaret Court Arena and Bendigo Stadium.

List of captains
Collingwood's inaugural captain was Madi Browne, who led the team to a finals place in the inaugural season. The club became the first in the league's history to appoint co-captains, when English international Geva Mentor was appointed alongside Browne in 2019.
 Madison Browne (2017–2020)
 Geva Mentor (2019–present)
 Ash Brazill (2022-present)

2023 players

Competitive record

Tasmanian Magpies

The Tasmanian Magpies are the reserve team of Collingwood Magpies. They play in the Australian Netball League. They were ANL champions in 2018.

Honours

Club achievements
 Premierships (0): Nil
 Minor Premierships (0): Nil
 Pre-Season Premierships (1): 2019
 Reserve Grade Premierships (1): 2018
 Netball New Zealand Super Club Titles (1): 2019

Best and fairests

See also

 Suncorp Super Netball
 Collingwood Football Club

References

External links
 Official website

 
Sports clubs established in 2017
2017 establishments in Australia
Collingwood Football Club
Suncorp Super Netball teams
 Coll
Sport in the City of Melbourne (LGA)